Alfred Edward Robie Farmer Cheatle (Born Dosthill, Staffordshire 15 January 1871 - 29 November 1941 Woodleigh Nursing Home, Wylde Green) was an architect based in Birmingham.

Life and career
Cheatle was the son of Thomas Farmer Cheatle (1840-1918) and Mary Sarsons (b. 1838). He entered into a partnership around 1891 with Thomas Walter Francis Newton as his partner, and until the death of Newton in 1903, they traded as Newton and Cheatle. Cheatle married Rhoda Beatrice Barker (1872-1956) on 22 May 1901 in Kingsbury, Warwickshire. They had two children, Godfrey Barker and Kathleen Thelma.

Cheatle was for many years chairman of Tamworth Rural District Council. In later life, he lived in Chalford, Four Oaks, Birmingham. He left an estate of £16,329 9s 10d.

List of works
134 Edmund Street, Birmingham 1895
37 and 39 Church Street, Birmingham 1898
City Arcade, Union Street, Birmingham 1898-1901
121-123 Edmund Street, Birmingham 1899
125-131 St Edward’s Chambers, Birmingham 1899
56-60 Newhall Street, Birmingham 1900
41 and 43 Church Street, Birmingham 1900
95 Cornwall Street, Birmingham 1901
93 Cornwall Street, Birmingham 1902
Fighting Cocks public house, Moseley, Birmingham 1903

References

1871 births
1941 deaths
People from Tamworth, Staffordshire
Architects from Birmingham, West Midlands